Faunce is an unincorporated community in Lake of the Woods County, Minnesota, United States.

Notes

Unincorporated communities in Lake of the Woods County, Minnesota
Unincorporated communities in Minnesota